Jeanett Kristiansen (born 24 December 1992) is a Norwegian handball player for Follo HK.

She also represented Norway in the 2011 Women's Junior European Handball Championship, placing 12th, and in the 2012 Women's Junior World Handball Championship, placing 8th.

She is a younger sister of international handballer Veronica Kristiansen and handballer Charlotte Kristiansen.

Achievements
EHF Champions League:
Winner: 2020/2021
Bronze Medalist: 2018/2019
EHF Cup: 
Finalist: 2018
Norwegian League:
Winner: 2013/2014 (Larvik), 2017/2018 (Vipers), 2018/2019 (Vipers), 2020/2021 (Vipers)
Silver Medalist: 2014/2015 (Glassverket), 2016/2017 (Vipers), 2021/2022 (Storhamar)
Bronze Medalist: 2015/2016 (Glassverket)
Norwegian Cup:
Winner: 2013, 2017, 2018, 2020
Silver: 2015
Danish Cup:
Winner: 2019

References

Norwegian female handball players
1992 births
Living people
Norwegian expatriate sportspeople in Denmark
Sportspeople from Drammen
21st-century Norwegian women